Odate Dam  is an arch dam located in Kagoshima Prefecture in Japan. The dam is used for power production. The catchment area of the dam is 92.5 km2. The dam impounds about 13  ha of land when full and can store 2265 thousand cubic meters of water. The construction of the dam was started on 1959 and completed in 1963.

See also
List of dams in Japan

References

Dams in Kagoshima Prefecture